Ringturm (Ring Tower) is a prominent skyscraper in Vienna, Austria, and is the headquarters of the Vienna Insurance Group. It was built from 1953 to 1955 after a design by Erich Boltenstern at the Schottenring. It is a venue for architecture exhibitions, and is known for being turned into a piece of art annually, wrapped in cloth designed by notable artists including Robert Hammerstiel, Xenia Hausner, Arnulf Rainer and Mihael Milunović.

History 
The building was erected on a property that held the only building of the Schottenring demolished in the war. At 23 floors, it is the second highest building within the Vienna Ringstraße, after the Stephansdom. The building has  of office space, and is the headquarters of the Vienna Insurance Group. The facade and some other parts were reconstructed in 1996.

Name 
The name was found by a competition. It was chosen from 6,502 suggestions, including City-Haus, Gutwill-Haus, Haus der Gegenseitigkeit, Hoch-Eck, Neues Hochhaus and Sonnblick-Haus.

Weather beacon 

On top of the tower is a weather beacon (Wetterleuchtturm)  in height. Its 117 lamps (39 white, red and green) indicate weather predictions for the following day by partly blinking and moving combinations. It is connected to the ZAMG (Zentralanstalt für Meteorologie und Geodynamik), the centre for weather forecast on the Hohe Warte. The top has two aircraft warning lights.

Beacon indicators
 red lights increasing in luminosity = rising temperature
 red lights decreasing in luminosity = falling temperature
 green lights increasing in luminosity = improving weather
 green lights decreasing in luminosity = worsening weather
 green lights with uniform luminosity = steady weather
 red lights blinking = storm warning
 white lights blinking = snow or black ice

Exhibition and events 
Beginning in 1998, architectural exhibitions have been displayed in the entrance hall free of charge. A series Architektur im Ringturm is focused on architecture of Austria, Central Europe and Eastern Europe.

Ringturmverhüllung 
Since 2006, the Ringturm has been transformed into a piece of art each summer by being wrapped in cloth designed by prominent artists from Austria and Eastern Europe.

The projects have included:

 2007: Turm des Lebens by Robert Hammerstiel
 2008: Turm in Blüte by 
 2011: Familiensinn by Xenia Hausner
 2013: Verbundenheit by Dorota Sadovská from Serbia
 2014: Schleier der Agnes by Arnulf Rainer, 16 June to 17 September, for the first time with an exhibition
 2015: Sommerfreuden by Tanja Deman from Croatia
 2016: Sorgenfrei by Ivan Exner from the Czech Republic
 2017: Weitblick (Vision) by Mihael Milunović from Serbia
 2018: I Saw This by Gottfried Helnwein
 2019: Zukunftsträume by Daniela Kostova from Bulgaria
 2020: no wrapping due to the COVID-19 pandemic.
 2022: With One Other by Dóra Maurer

References

Further reading 
 Adolph Stiller: Der Ringturm. 5 Jahrzehnte Baugeschichte eines Hochhauses . Verlag Anton Pustet, Salzburg 1998, .
 Wiener Städtische Versicherung (ed.): 50 Jahre Ringturm. Von Österreich ins geeinte Europa: Unternehmenssitz – Menschen – Geschichte . Echomedia, Wien, 2005, .

External links 

 Foto: Ringturm in Bau (image from during construction), Vienna, 2005 
 Daniela Hahn: Wiener Hochhausarchitektur, Universität Wien 2011 
 History Vienna Insurance Group 

Buildings and structures completed in the 1950s
Buildings and structures in Innere Stadt
Skyscrapers in Vienna